Sierra Passage is a 1950 American Western film directed by Frank McDonald and written by Warren Douglas, Samuel Roeca and Tom W. Blackburn. The film stars Wayne Morris, Lola Albright, Lloyd Corrigan, Alan Hale Jr., Roland Winters and Jim Bannon. The film was released on December 31, 1950, by Monogram Pictures.

Plot

Cast
Wayne Morris as Johnny Yorke
Lola Albright as Ann Walker
Lloyd Corrigan as Thaddeus Kring
Alan Hale Jr. as Yance Carter
Roland Winters as Sam Cooper
Jim Bannon as Jud Yorke
Billy Gray as Young Johnny Yorke
Paul McGuire as Andy
Richard Karlan as Bart

References

The railroad scenes were filmed on the Sierra Railroad in Tuolumne County, California.

References

External links
 

1950 films
1950s English-language films
American Western (genre) films
1950 Western (genre) films
Monogram Pictures films
Films directed by Frank McDonald
American black-and-white films
1950s American films